Thomas Ewen Douglas-Powell (born 16 September 1992) is an Australian volleyball player. Tom first started playing volleyball at Brisbane Grammar School in 2005. In 2009 Tom accepted a scholarship at the Queensland Academy of Sport, and this led to his first Australian National Junior Team selection later that year. He was first invited to trial for the Volleyroos in 2013, and was selected to compete at the world FISU Games in Russia.  After this, he was selected to be a part of the Volleyroos and was part of the team thatcompeted at the Asian Championships in Dubai, that won FIVB World League Group 2 in 2014, qualified for the second round of the 2014 World Championships,and played in the 2015 FIVB World League Elite 8. He also participated in the 2018 and 2021 VNL competitions. He is currently playing in Sporting Clube de Portugal, Portugal.

He is the brother of actress Emma Ishta.

References

External links
 profile at FIVB.org

Australian men's volleyball players
Living people
1992 births